Aksyon Dabaw is a regional newscast of TV5 in Davao City, which premiered on May 5, 2014. It is the second Aksyon regional edition opposite Aksyon Bisaya, the flagship regional newscast of TV5 Cebu Channel-21. It airs every Monday to Friday at 3:45 pm over TV5 Davao Channel-2 and AksyonTV-29 Davao. It is anchored by Mikey Aportadera and Gem Avancena-Arenas. The newscast is simulcast on radio through Radyo 5 101.9 News FM Davao.

On September 8, 2016, Aksyon Dabaw (after 2 years) as Aksyon Alerto Davao and Cebu's Aksyon Bisaya were cancelled due to cost-cutting measures by the network to sustain its day-by-day operations. Although the newscast was ended, the reporters and cameramen were remain employed and they will continue to give reports for Aksyon newscast seen nationally on TV5.

Final anchors
Mikey Aportadera
Gem Avancena-Arenas
Robert Teo - Segment anchor for "Aksyon Weather" and "Today in History"

Final reporters
 Paolo Anota
 Mike Pasco
 Lerma Alingalan
 Irene dela Cruz

See also
Aksyon

References

Television in Davao City
TV5 (Philippine TV network) news shows
2014 Philippine television series debuts
2016 Philippine television series endings